Maude E. Ten Eyck (August 21, 1902 – March 7, 1977) was an American politician from New York.

Life
She was born Maude Edwards on August 21, 1902, in Brookline, Massachusetts. She married Lansing V. Ten Eyck (1898–1977), and their son was Lansing Ten Eyck Jr.

She became active in politics as a Republican, was President of the Young Women's Republican Club of New York City, was appointed as clerk to several State Senate committees, and was an alternate delegate to the 1940 Republican National Convention and a delegate to the 1944 Republican National Convention.

She was a member of the New York State Assembly (New York Co., 1st D.) from 1947 to 1954, sitting in the 166th, 167th, 168th and 169th New York State Legislatures. In November 1954, she ran for re-election, but was defeated.

She was a Deputy Journal Clerk of the State Assembly from 1955 to 1964.

Later she removed to Waterford, New York.

She died on March 7, 1977, in Cohoes Memorial Hospital in Cohoes, New York.

Speaker of the New York State Assembly Truman G. Younglove (1815–1882) was her great-grandfather.

Sources

20th-century American politicians
20th-century American women politicians
1902 births
1977 deaths
Republican Party members of the New York State Assembly
Politicians from Brookline, Massachusetts
Politicians from Manhattan
Maude E.
Women state legislators in New York (state)